Eclipta curtipennis is a species of beetle in the family Cerambycidae. It was described by Zajciw in 1966.

References

Eclipta (beetle)
Beetles described in 1966